Engina fasciata is a species of sea snail, a marine gastropod mollusc in the family Pisaniidae.

Description

Distribution
This species occurs in the Indian Ocean off Madagascar.

References

 Fraussen K., Monnier E. & Rosado J. (2015). Two new Engina Gray, 1839 (Gastropoda: Buccinidae) from south-west Indian Ocean. Xenophora Taxonomy. 6: 13–18.

External links

Pisaniidae
Gastropods described in 2009